Géza Képes (February 1, 1909, Mátészalka, Hungary – August 19, 1989, Budapest, Hungary) was a Hungarian poet, translator and polyglot.

References

External links
Hungarian Radio 

1909 births
1989 deaths
People from Mátészalka
Hungarian male poets
Hungarian translators
20th-century translators
20th-century Hungarian poets
20th-century Hungarian male writers
Attila József Prize recipients